"End of Me" is a song by Finnish rock band Apocalyptica, the song is released as the first single from their seventh studio album 7th Symphony. The song features Gavin Rossdale of Bush on lead vocals. It was first released on iTunes on 2 August 2010 and in Germany on 6 August 2010.

The music video for "End of Me" was shot in a crematorium in Altadena, California at the end of May 2010. The band worked again with Canadian Lisa Mann who directed the video for "I Don't Care" from the album Worlds Collide.

Formats and track listings
 Maxi-CD
"End of Me" - 3:30
"Path" (Acoustic at XM Radio) - 2:38

 iTunes digital bundle
"End of Me" - 3:30
"Path" (Acoustic at XM Radio) - 2:38
"End of Me" (300mph Remix) - 3:19
"End of Me" (Video) – 3:37

Charts

Weekly charts

Year-end charts

References

2010 singles
Apocalyptica songs
Songs written by Johnny Andrews
Songs written by Gavin Rossdale
Songs written by Eicca Toppinen
2010 songs